Thongalen (also, Thongalel, Thongaren or Thongarel) is the god of the dead and the king of the underworld in Meitei mythology and religion of Ancient Kangleipak (Antique Manipur). 
He is the Guardian God of the nadir. The underworld, which is the land of death, has Khamnung Sawa as its capital in Meitei mythology.
 
He is the ancestor-God of the Khuman clan of Meitei people. Laikhurembi and Lainaotabi are his wives.

The Pakhangba Nonggarol text says the God of death is called "Leinung Thongarel".

Mythology

In the Poireiton Khunthok 
King Thongaren asked his highest ranked Queen Laikhurembi to go with his brother Chingkhong Poireiton on a long trip. Poireiton was a widower; his wife had died, and he had six children to raise and also had to go to the Tai Pang Pan. King Thongalel thought his brother needed a wife to go with him on their trip. However, Queen Laikhurembi did not want to go. She said she was already the king's wife. Trees had already been planted in her honor because she and the king had lived together for a very long time. So, instead of Queen Laikhurembi, King Thongalel sent his second wife, Leinaotabi, to go with Poireiton and be his wife.

In the Pombi Luwaoba 
Nongban Pombi Luwaoba was a prince in the Luwang dynasty. Prince Nongban Pombi Luwaoba and his wife Namoinu were happy. Then she died suddenly. She died because of the God Thongalel. Prince Pombi Luwaoba refused to perform the funeral of her dead body. He hoped the God Thongalel would send her soul back into her body so she would be alive again. God Thongalel received a message from the prince through a pheasant bird. The message said that Prince Nongban Pombi Luwaoba was ready to fight God Thongalel if he did not send Namoinu's soul back. This made the God Thongalel angry. He sent two of his brothers, but Prince Nongban Pombi Luwaoba beat them both.  He took them prisoner. Prince Nongban Pombi Luwaoba sent the pheasant bird with another message to God Thongalel. The message said that if the God wanted to get back his brothers alive, then he had to sent back the soul of Namoinu to her body.

Finally, God Thongalel came to meet Prince Pombi Luwaoba himself. But instead of fighting, the prince prayed to the God Himself. God Thongalel was happy that Prince Nongban Pombi Luwaoba showed him respect. Thongalel brought Namoinu back to life. He also gave her a gift: She would live for 100 years and have 100 sons.

Hymns 
The Meitei people in ancient times, worshipped the deity along with a hymn, which reads as follows:-

Texts 
 According to ancient Meitei chronicle "Poireiton Khunthok", a band of colonists led by Poireiton came from the land of death, whose king was Lord Thongaren.
 According to ancient Meitei chronicle "Nongban Pombi Luwaoba", there was a conflict between Nongban Pombi Luwaoba and a messenger of Thongaren and subsequent reconciliation with Lord Thongaren himself.

Association with other deities 
God Thongalen is sometimes identified as God Wangpurel. Thongalen is the King of underworld. Wangpurel reigns over the direction south. Some Meiteis believe that the direction south is the land of death. So, when the Meiteis got converted into Hinduism, both Thongalen and Wangpulel became counterparts of Hindu God Yama.

See also 
 Nongpok Ningthou
 Lainingthou Sanamahi

References 

Arts deities
Arts gods
Death deities
Death gods
Fortune deities
Fortune gods
Justice deities
Justice gods
Kings in Meitei mythology
Life-death-rebirth deities
Life-death-rebirth gods
Liminal deities
Liminal gods
Love and lust deities
Love and lust gods
Magic deities
Magic gods
Maintenance deities
Maintenance gods
Meitei deities
Names of God in Sanamahism
Nature deities
Nature gods
Ningthou
Peace deities
Peace gods
Savior deities
Savior gods
Time and fate deities
Time and fate gods
Underworld deities
Underworld gods